The Lehigh Valley Zoo is a  zoo located in Schnecksville, Pennsylvania in the Lehigh Valley region of eastern Pennsylvania. It is located inside the  Trexler Nature Preserve. The zoo is open year round.

Lehigh Valley Zoo has been accredited by the Association of Zoos and Aquariums (AZA) since March 2006.

History

In 1906, Harry Clay Trexler started purchasing farms in the Lowhill and North Whitehall townships of Pennsylvania to create a preserve to help protect bison, elk, and white-tailed deer. In all, he purchased 36 farms totaling  before he died, and then bequeathed the land to Lehigh County. In 1935, the area officially became the Trexler-Lehigh County Game Preserve.

Construction on the children's zoo within the park began in 1974. When it opened, the zoo included petting and feeding exhibits as well as exotic animals from Africa, Asia, and Australia.

In 2004, since the original purpose of saving native species had been accomplished, the county opened the entire preserve to the public. At the same time, the Lehigh Valley Zoological Society took over management of the zoo within the park.

Conservation

In 2009, the zoo was participating in three Species Survival Plans (SSP): African penguin, mongoose lemur, and scimitar-horned oryx.

Gallery

Notes

External links

1974 establishments in Pennsylvania
Buildings and structures in Lehigh County, Pennsylvania
Tourist attractions in Lehigh County, Pennsylvania
Zoos established in 1974
Zoos in Pennsylvania